Walter Francis Williams (30 April 1921 – 8 January 2009) was a New Zealand water polo player.

At the 1950 British Empire Games, he won the silver medal as part of the men's water polo team.

A retired commercial salesman, Williams died in Dunedin on 8 January 2009.

References

1921 births
2009 deaths
Sportspeople from Dunedin
Commonwealth Games silver medallists for New Zealand
New Zealand male water polo players
Water polo players at the 1950 British Empire Games
Commonwealth Games competitors for New Zealand